Abraham Viruthakulangara was an Indian archbishop of Nagpur. He was also the President of the Maharashtra Regional Bishops' Conference.

Early life 
Abraham was born on 5 June 1943 in Kerala, India. He completed his Major studies from St. Charles’ Seminary Nagpur.  He completed  B.A. in Hindi from Sagar University, Madhya Pradesh. He also held Baccalaureate in Theology.

Priesthood 
Abraham was ordained a Catholic priest on 28 October 1969.

Episcopate 
Abraham was appointed Bishop of Khandwa on 4 March 1977 and was ordained a bishop on 13 July 1977. He was appointed Archbishop of Nagpur, India on 17 January 
1998.
He was only an eight year priest when he was ordained as a bishop 
And was a bishop for more than 40 years 
With simple and humble living.

Death
On 19 April 2018 (around midnight - 1 am IST) he died from a cardiac arrest after attending a bishops' conference in New Delhi.

References

External links 

1943 births
2018 deaths
Christian clergy from Kottayam
20th-century Roman Catholic archbishops in India
21st-century Roman Catholic archbishops in India